Céline Chartrand (born 26 May 1962) is a Canadian former athlete. She competed in the women's javelin throw at the 1988 Summer Olympics.

References

External links
 
 
 
 
 

1962 births
Living people
Athletes (track and field) at the 1982 Commonwealth Games
Athletes (track and field) at the 1986 Commonwealth Games
Commonwealth Games competitors for Canada
Athletes (track and field) at the 1987 Pan American Games
Pan American Games track and field athletes for Canada
Athletes (track and field) at the 1988 Summer Olympics
Canadian female javelin throwers
Olympic track and field athletes of Canada
World Athletics Championships athletes for Canada
Sportspeople from Laval, Quebec
20th-century Canadian women
21st-century Canadian women